Wu Ti-jung (born 23 February 1993) is a Taiwanese badminton player. Teamed-up with Lee Chia-hsin, she won the 2013 Polish International tournament. Her big achievement is to win the women's doubles title at the 2014 U.S. Open Grand Prix partnered with Hsieh Pei-chen.

Achievements

Summer Universiade 
Women's doubles

BWF World Tour (1 runner-up) 
The BWF World Tour, which was announced on 19 March 2017 and implemented in 2018, is a series of elite badminton tournaments, sanctioned by Badminton World Federation (BWF). The BWF World Tour is divided into six levels, namely World Tour Finals, Super 1000, Super 750, Super 500, Super 300 (part of the HSBC World Tour), and the BWF Tour Super 100.

Mixed doubles

BWF Grand Prix (1 title) 
The BWF Grand Prix had two levels, the Grand Prix and Grand Prix Gold. It was a series of badminton tournaments, sanctioned by the Badminton World Federation (BWF) from 2007 to 2017.

Women's doubles

  BWF Grand Prix Gold tournament
  BWF Grand Prix tournament

BWF International Challenge/Series (4 titles, 2 runners-up) 
Women's doubles

Mixed doubles

  BWF International Challenge tournament
  BWF International Series tournament
  BWF Future Series tournament

References

External links 

 

1993 births
Living people
Sportspeople from Taipei
Taiwanese female badminton players
Badminton players at the 2018 Asian Games
Asian Games competitors for Chinese Taipei
Universiade gold medalists for Chinese Taipei
Universiade medalists in badminton
Medalists at the 2017 Summer Universiade
21st-century Taiwanese women